Kattamordo Heritage Trail is a walk track in the Shire of Mundaring and the City of Kalamunda in the Darling Range.

Route
 1908 – Mundaring weir horse tramway
1872 – Munday Brook horse tramway

It also passes close to Mount Gunjin and Mundaring Weir Road, and through Kalamunda.

It has end points in Mundaring and at
Bickley Brook Reservoir.

See also
 Bibbulmun Track
 Kep Track

Notes

References

Shire of Mundaring
Kalamunda, Western Australia
Hiking and bushwalking tracks in Western Australia
Heritage trails in Western Australia